Short form may refer to:

 Short form cricket, a reduced version of cricket
 Shortform improvisation, a form of improvisational comedy
 in linguistics, a synonym for abbreviation
 Form 1040A, also known as "the short form", an American tax form
 a type of census questionnaire
 Sub-styles of Yang-style t'ai chi ch'uan
 The Short Form, a 1997 album by Raphe Malik

See also
 Short (disambiguation)
 Long form (disambiguation)